Sean Leon Labanowski (born December 9, 1992) is an Israeli-American professional basketball player for Hapoel Afula of the Israeli National League.

Early life
Labanowski was born in Boynton Beach, Florida. Labanowski lived his first 6 years in the United States before growing up in Hefer Valley, Israel. He played for Beitar Binyamina youth team and Sharet Netanya high school team. Labanowski joined Maccabi Tel Aviv youth team in his late teens.

Professional career
In 2010, Labanowski started his professional career with Maccabi Tel Aviv. On May 12, 2011, he made his professional debut in a playoff win over Barak Netanya.

On September 8, 2011, Labanowski signed a three-year deal with Maccabi Haifa.

On November 28, 2012, Labanowski was loaned to Maccabi Kiryat Bialik of the Israeli National League. In 22 games played for Kiryat Bialik, he averaged 10 points and 4.4 rebounds per game.

On August 21, 2013, Labanowski signed a three-year deal with Maccabi Ashdod.

On February 14, 2018, Labanowski signed with Hapoel Gilboa Galil for the rest of the season. Labanowski helped Gilboa Galil to reach the 2018 Israeli League Playoffs, where they eventually lost to Hapoel Jerusalem.

On August 1, 2018, Labanowski signed a one-year contract extension with Gilboa Galil.

On July 23, 2019, Labanowski signed with Hapoel Afula of the Israeli National League for the 2019–20 season.

Israel national team
Labanowski was a member of the U-16, U-18 and U-20 Israel national teams.

Personal life
His father, Kenny Labanowski, is an American-Israeli former basketball player who played in Israel in the '80s.

References

External links
 RealGM profile
 FIBA profile

1992 births
Living people
American emigrants to Israel
Centers (basketball)
Hapoel Afula players
Hapoel Gilboa Galil Elyon players
Ironi Ramat Gan players
Israeli men's basketball players
Israeli Basketball Premier League players
Israeli Jews
Jewish men's basketball players
Maccabi Ashdod B.C. players
Maccabi Haifa B.C. players
Maccabi Tel Aviv B.C. players
Power forwards (basketball)